The Baikonyr or Baikonur is a river in the Ulytau District, Karaganda Region, Kazakhstan.

The river flows by Baikonur village. Ancient petroglyphs have been found on rocks along both banks of river Baikonyr.

Course
The Baikonyr river has its origin at the confluence of rivers Kurambai (Kuanbai) and Aktas in the southwestern slopes of the Ulutau Range. In its final stretch it flows roughly westwards, bending northwestwards to end up in the southeastern end of the Shubarteniz lake, to the south of the mouth of the Zhymyky.

The Baikonyr is fed by the winter snows. In the spring its water is fresh. But it turns salty as the flow diminishes and in the summer it dries largely up, breaking up into small pools.

See also
List of rivers of Kazakhstan

References

External links
Сердце Казахстана — Улытау (in Russian)
Пресс-релиз — Аральское море (in Russian)
Туристско-научная экспедиция - Казахстанская правда (in Russian)
История Улытау (in Russian)

Rivers of Kazakhstan
Karaganda Region
Shalkarteniz basin